Vlahakis or Vlahaki is a Greek surname that may refer to
Panayiota Vlahaki (born 1991), Greek long-distance runner
Peter Vlahakis (born 1982), American lacrosse player 
Van Vlahakis (1935–2014), American entrepreneur of Greek origin

Greek-language surnames
Surnames